Pertek District is a district of Tunceli Province in Turkey. The town of Pertek is its seat and the district had a population of 11,011 in 2021. Kaymakam is Arif Gül.

Composition 
Beside the town of Pertek, the district encompasses forty-five villages and seventy-five hamlets.

Villages 
 Akdemir
 Ardıç
 Arpalı
 Aşağıgülbahçe
 Ayazpınar
 Bakırlı
 Ballıdut
 Beydamı
 Biçmekaya
 Bulgurtepe
 Çakırbahçe
 Çalıözü
 Çataksu
 Çukurca
 Demirsaban
 Dere
 Dereli
 Dorutay
 Elmakaşı
 Geçityaka
 Gövdeli
 Günboğazı
 Kacarlar
 Karagüney
 Kayabağ
 Kazılı
 Koçpınar
 Kolankaya
 Konaklar
 Konurat
 Korluca
 Mercimek
 Pınarlar
 Pirinççi
 Sağman
 Söğütlütepe
 Sumak
 Sürgüç
 Tozkoparan
 Ulupınar
 Yalınkaya
 Yamaçoba
 Yeniköy
 Yukarıgülbahçe
 Yukarıyakabaşı

References 

Districts of Tunceli Province
Pertek District